Lamoka projectile points are stone projectile points manufactured by Native Americans what is now the Northeastern United States, generally in the time interval of 3500-2500 B.C. They predate the invention of the bow and arrow, and are therefore not true "arrowheads", but rather atlatl dart points. They derive their name from the specimens found at the Lamoka site in Schuyler County, New York.

Description 

Lamoka points sizes range in length from less than an inch to 2½ inches with an average of about 1½ inches. They are narrow and thick, with straight or slightly notched stems. The base is thick and this is diagnostic for the Lamoka point. They are two to three times longer than they are wide. They are generally made from local flints, jasper, quartz and quartzite. There are a number of varieties, the most common being the "stemmed" type with straight stems.

Age and cultural affiliations 

They have mostly been dated to around 3500-2500 BC, but the type persists in small numbers up to about 1000 A.D. The archaic points are associated with the Lamoka culture.

Distribution 

These points are generally found in the American northeast (New York and Pennsylvania; a very similar "Dustin point" is found as far west as Michigan) and central Canada (Ontario).

See also
Other projectile points

External links 
 Virginia Department of Historic Resources

References 

Projectile points
Primitive technology
Indigenous weapons of the Americas